is a railway station on the Iwate Ginga Railway Line in the town of Ichinohe, Iwate Prefecture, Japan operated by the third-sector railway operator Iwate Ginga Railway Company.

Lines
Oku-nakayama kōgen Station is served by the Iwate Ginga Railway Line, and is located 44.4 kilometers from the starting point of the line at Morioka Station and 579.7 kilometers from Tokyo Station.

Station layout
Oku-nakayama kōgen Station has an island platform and a single side platform connected to the station building by a footbridge.  The station is staffed.

Platforms

Adjacent stations

History
It was renamed  on 11 September 1915. The station was absorbed into the JR East network upon the privatization of Japanese National Railways (JNR) on 1 April 1987 and was transferred to the Iwate Ginga Railway on 1 September 2002. It was renamed Oku-nakayama kōgen Station at the same time.

Passenger statistics
In fiscal 2015, the station was used by an average of 355 passengers daily.

Surrounding area
Okunakayama Post Office

Climate

See also
 List of Railway Stations in Japan

References

External links

  

Railway stations in Iwate Prefecture
Iwate Galaxy Railway Line
Railway stations in Japan opened in 1891
Ichinohe, Iwate